Olefirenko is a Ukrainian surname. Notable people with the surname include:

 Ihor Olefirenko (born 1990), Ukrainian athlete
 Mykhaylo Olefirenko (born 1960), Ukrainian footballer
 Olena Olefirenko (born 1978), Ukrainian rower

See also
 

Ukrainian-language surnames